Khieu Thavika is the Ambassador Extraordinary and Plenipotentiary of the Kingdom of Cambodia to the Russian Federation.

See also 
Cambodia–Russia relations
Foreign relations of Cambodia

References 

Cambodian diplomats
Year of birth missing (living people)
Living people
Ambassadors of Cambodia to Russia